Bernie de Le Cuona is a British entrepreneur and the CEO and founder of de Le Cuona, a company that makes interior textiles and accessories using natural fibres. She was included in a list of the 50 most influential people in British luxury according to the Walpole Power List 2020 and as 'one to watch' in private equity firm LDC's 'The Top 50 most Ambitious Business Leaders' 2019.
In 2020, de Le Cuona launched a 100% organic linen fabric collection called Pure.

Early life and education

Honours and awards
	
 2010 - Art of Design Veranda Awards for Fabric design, judged by fashion designer Oscar de la Renta, architect Peter Pennoyer, and designers Rose Tarlow and Holly Hunt.
 2019 - Elle Decoration, Russia for the Fabric Collection of the year
 2019 - The World of Interiors, Showstopper Award
 2020 - The 50 Most Influential People in British Luxury, Walpole Power List 2020

References

Year of birth missing (living people)
Living people